Kharali (sometimes spelled as Khurali or Khuralgarh) is a village located in Garhshanker area of Hoshiarpur district, Punjab, India. Village is known for Shri Khuralgarh Sahib, a place visited by the social reformer and spiritual figure Ravidas.

Demographics 
Kharali village has total population of 343 families. The village has population of 1786 persons having 901 males and 885 females. Children population with age 0-6 is 201 which makes up 11.25% of total population. Average Sex Ratio is 982 higher than Punjab state average of 895. As in 2011 census, literacy rate of the village was 76.53%. 37.79% of total population is Schedule Caste/Dalit at the village.

See also 
Shri Khuralgarh Sahib, religious place in Kharali.

References 

Villages in Hoshiarpur district